British Concession of Jiujiang was established in 1861. It was officially ended in 1929 when the Chen-O'Malley Agreement was signed. There was a sizable European community living in Jiujiang during that period. It was Jiujiang's only concession.

Historical background 
After China's defeat in the Second Opium War, China and Britain signed the Treaty of Tientsin. At the beginning of the eleventh year of Xianfeng (1861), the British Counsellor, Harry Parkes, went to the new port on the Yangtse River by naval vessel according to the treaty to investigate the situation and select the site of concession to be opened. After the concession sites of Zhenjiang and Hankou were delimited on March 22, Harry Parkes returned to Jiujiang from Hankou and decided to open up a commercial port in Jiujiang.

Historical development

Late Qing period 
In the 11th year of Xianfeng (1861), Zhang Jixin, general minister of Jiangxi province signed, along with Harry Parkes, the treaty for opening up the British concession in Jiujiang, the Treaty of Land Lease in Jiujiang. The concession was located in a narrow area to the west of Jiujiang, between the Yangtze River and Gantang Lake, to the west of Longkai River, with a length of 150 zhang from east to west and a depth of 60 zhang from south to north, covering an area of 150 acres. The southern part of the concession includes part of PenPu Port.

On March 27, the first year of Tongzhi (1862), when the British were re-surveying the boundary of the concession, there was a conflict with the local residents.

In 1891, the British Concession Bureau of Industry reclaimed the outer parts of the Penpu port as parks and courses.

On April 26, 1909, the first year of Xuantong (1909), a Chinese merchant, Yu Facheng, was killed by a British policeman, which triggered a "boycott of British goods" in Jiujiang that lasted several months.

The Republic of China era 
In the eighth year of the Republic of China (1919), people in Jiujiang protested against the British concession authorities' activities of levying taxes on transit luggage and goods.

On June 13, 1925, in support of the May 30th Movement, the masses in Jiujiang launched an attack on the British Concession.

Return to Chinese government 
Encouraged by the occupation of Hankou by the Northern Expedition Army. On January 9, 1927, the "Jiujiang Citizens' Diplomatic Action Committee to Britain", which was jointly organized by various groups of Jiujiang citizens, was established.  On the afternoon of January 13, the citizens of Jiujiang held an anti-British movement demonstration meeting on the drill ground. More than 10,000 people attended the meeting. The crowd was furious and shouted slogans such as "Down with British imperialism" and "Take back the British Concession".

The concession was later occupied by National government's troops to prevent it from being looting by the violent crowds. However, the British did not officially give up the concession until two years later. In 1929, when the Chen-O'Malley Agreement was signed, the concession was officially returned to Chinese government.

Modern development

Transformed into a tourist attraction 
In 2016, Jiujiang people's government decided to repair four buildings left from the concession and transform them into a cultural and historical block, called Jiujiang 1858. The block is located on Binjiang road. The four buildings are as follows:
 Former Taiwan Bank of Japan
 Former Japanese Consulate
 Former Japanese Consulate Residential Building 
 Former Asiatic Petroleum Firm Residential Building

Of the four buildings, the former site of Asiatic Petroleum Firm Residential Apartment was turned into British Concession Museum.

Important visitors 
In 2018, then Hōfu mayor and president of National Mayors Association of Japan (NMAJ), Masato Matsuura (松浦正人), led a delegation of NMAJ visited the museum. 
Masato Matsuura said :I was born in the former Japanese consulate. Jiujiang is my second hometown. I am deeply attached to the beautiful landscape here.

References

Concessions in China
Former British colonies and protectorates in Asia
Jiujiang